Russebuholmane are the four westernmost islets in Kong Ludvigøyane, part of Thousand Islands, an archipelago south of Edgeøya. The largest is Ækongen. The three outermost islands are collectively called Russeholmane. They are named after a Russian trapper's hut found on one of the islets. One of the three is named Russeholmen.

References 
 Norwegian Polar Institute Place Names of Svalbard Database

Islands of Svalbard